Delma Gisu  (born 2 July 1996) is an Australian rules footballer who played for Greater Western Sydney in the AFL Women's (AFLW) competition.

Early life 
Delma Gisu was born in 1996 in Townsville, Queensland. She was playing for the Wilston Grange Gorillas when she was drafted. She was the first Torres-Strait Islander to be drafted into the AFLW.

AFLW career 
Gisu was recruited by Greater Western Sydney as the number 65 pick in the 2018 AFL Women's draft. Previously, she was named in the inaugural Winter Series team of the Gold Coast Suns in May 2018.

Greater Western Sydney signed Gisu for the 2019 season during the trade period in October 2018. She made her debut in the AFLW in the final round of the 2019 AFLW season against Geelong.

In April 2019, Gisu was delisted by Greater Western Sydney.

References 

1996 births
Living people
Australian rules footballers from Queensland
Sportspeople from Townsville
Greater Western Sydney Giants (AFLW) players
Indigenous Australian players of Australian rules football